Warszawska Street in Katowice (Warsaw Street) is a street in the centre of Katowice. The street was built in the 19th century. Until 1922 and during World War II the street was called Friedrichstraße, 1926–1939 Marszałka Piłsudskiego (Piłsudski Street).

Buildings 
 Kościół Zmartwychwstania Pańskiego (Protestant Church)
 Old tenement houses

References 

Streets in Katowice